Battleford or Battlefords may refer to:

Places
 Fort Battleford, a North-West Mounted Police post in what is now Saskatchewan, Canada
 Battleford, Saskatchewan, Canada; a town
 North Battleford, Saskatchewan, Canada; a city
 The Battlefords, Saskatchewan, Canada; both Battleford and North Battleford
 The Battlefords Provincial Park, a park in Saskatchewan

Electoral districts
 Battleford (provincial electoral district) (1904-1917) former provincial riding in Saskatchewan, Canada
 Battleford-Cut Knife (1995-2003) former provincial riding in Saskatchewan, Canada
 The Battlefords (provincial electoral district) (1917-1995; re-est. 2003), provincial riding in Saskatchewan, Canada
 Battleford (federal electoral district) (1908-1925) former federal riding in Saskatchewan, Canada
 South Battleford (1925-1935) former federal riding in Saskatchewan, Canada
 North Battleford (electoral district) (1917-1949) former federal riding in Saskatchewan, Canada
 The Battlefords (federal electoral district) (1935-1968) former federal riding in Saskatchewan, Canada
 Battleford—Kindersley (1968-1979) former federal riding in Saskatchewan, Canada
 The Battlefords—Meadow Lake (1979-1997) former federal riding in Saskatchewan, Canada
 Battlefords—Lloydminster (est. 1997) federal riding in Saskatchewan, Canada

Facilities and structures
 Battleford Court House, Battleford, Saskatchewan, Canada
 Battleford Industrial School (1883-1914) former residential school for aboriginal Canadians

Military topics
 , a Canadian Flower-class corvette of WWII
 The North Saskatchewan Regiment, formerly known as the Battleford Light Infantry
 Battle of Cut Knife (May 1885) a battle around Battleford, Saskatchewan, Canada
 Looting of Battleford (March 1885) a battle in Saskatchewan, Canada

See also
 North Battleford (disambiguation)
 Battle (disambiguation)
 Ford (disambiguation)